Rousseau is an unincorporated community in Breathitt County, Kentucky. Rousseau had a post office until it closed on January 3, 2004; it still has its own ZIP code, 41366.

A post office called Rousseau was established in 1882. The community has the name of a mill owner.

References

Unincorporated communities in Breathitt County, Kentucky
Unincorporated communities in Kentucky